Electronic Information Storage may refer to:

Computer data storage, computer components and recording media that retain digital data
Data storage device, a device for recording (storing) information (data)